The Plaza Hotel is a historic Renaissance/Mission Revival hotel located in Colorado Springs, Colorado and built by W. W. & G. F. Atkinson in 1901. The property is four stories tall and made of cream-colored pressed brick.

The building was listed on the National Register of Historic Places in 1983.

See also 

 National Register of Historic Places listings in El Paso County Colorado

References 

1901 establishments in Colorado
Hotel buildings completed in 1901
National Register of Historic Places in El Paso County, Colorado
Hotel buildings on the National Register of Historic Places in Colorado
Buildings and structures in Colorado Springs, Colorado